Jefferson Street Historic District is a national historic district  located at Bluefield, Mercer County, West Virginia.  The district includes 63 contributing buildings in a residential area of Bluefield known as Oakland Addition, originally platted in 1910.  The buildings are primarily single-family residences with a few multiple family dwellings, and one church, the College Avenue Baptist Church.  Houses are representative of popular architectural styles from the turn of the 20th century, including American Four Square, Bungalow, Colonial Revival, and Classical Revival.  A number of the homes were designed by architect Alex B. Mahood.

It was listed on the National Register of Historic Places in 1992.

References

American Foursquare architecture in West Virginia
Bungalow architecture in West Virginia
Neoclassical architecture in West Virginia
Colonial Revival architecture in West Virginia
Historic districts in Bluefield, West Virginia
National Register of Historic Places in Mercer County, West Virginia
Victorian architecture in West Virginia
Historic districts on the National Register of Historic Places in West Virginia